Secrets of the Terra-Cotta Soldier is a 2014 children's historical novel with fantasy elements written by Ying Chang Compestine and her son, Vinson Compestine. It is set in 1970s China.

Plot summary 
The story follows thirteen-year-old Ming, who lives in Communist China during the 1970s. Ming's father believes the lost tomb of Emperor Qin Shi Huang lies beneath the village and is forced to prove so before the village Political Officer sends him to a labor camp. While Ming's father is away on business, Ming befriends a Terra-Cotta soldier who has come to life. Together they embark on an adventure to uncover the mysteries of Emperor Qin's Mausoleum and save Ming's father's life.[2][3]

Characters 
 Ming - Protagonist, an archaeologist's son
 Ba Ba - Ming's father, an archaeologist
 Shí - A Terra-Cotta Soldier from Emperor Qin's Terra-Cotta army
 Gee Brothers - Farmers, first to unearth the Terra-Cotta Soldier[2]
 Political Officer (Goat Face) - Antagonist, political officer of Red Star, a Maoist government department 
 Emperor Qin Shi Huang - First emperor of China
 Teacher Panda - Ming's teacher
 Old men in tea-house - Ming's friends
 Feng - Shí's best friend, a Terra-Cotta soldier
 Liang - Shí's mentor
 Political Officer's Wife
 General Wang - Famous general in Emperor Qin's army, a Terra-Cotta soldier
 Si Ji - A Terra-Cotta soldier
 Director Gu - Ba Ba's friend, director of the Xi’an Museum
 Comrade Ding - New political officer of Red Star

Critical reception 
Secrets of the Terra-Cotta Soldier has received praise from readers and other literary organizations such as Publishers Weekly, Kirkus Reviews, Common Sense Media, and The Bulletin of the Center for Children's Books.

Awards 
 CALA Best Book Award of 2014

References

2014 American novels
2014 children's books
American children's novels
Children's historical novels
Novels set in China
Novels set in the 1970s
Abrams Books books
Works by Ying Chang Compestine